Alhambra Valley is a census-designated place in the Briones Hills of central Contra Costa County, California. The 2010 United States census reported that Alhambra Valley's population was 924. The Spanish name of the valley was  "Valley of Hunger"; it was adapted into English with obvious influence from "Alhambra".

Geography
According to the United States Census Bureau, the CDP has a total area of 2.155 square miles (5.581 km), all of it land.

Demographics

At the 2010 census Alhambra Valley had a population of 924. The racial makeup of Alhambra Valley was 838 (90.7%) White, 3 (0.3%) African American, 0 (0.0%) Native American, 42 (4.5%) Asian, 5 (0.5%) Pacific Islander, 17 (1.8%) from other races, and 19 (2.1%) from two or more races. Hispanic or Latino of any race were 81 people (8.8%).

The census reported that 100% of the population lived in households.

There were 360 households, 81 (22.5%) had children under the age of 18 living in them, 261 (72.5%) were opposite-sex married couples living together, 24 (6.7%) had a female householder with no husband present, 11 (3.1%) had a male householder with no wife present. There were 9 (2.5%) unmarried opposite-sex partnerships, and 3 (0.8%) same-sex married couples or partnerships. 51 households (14.2%) were one person and 26 (7.2%) had someone living alone who was 65 or older. The average household size was 2.57. There were 296 families (82.2% of households); the average family size was 2.77.

The age distribution was 143 people (15.5%) under the age of 18, 65 people (7.0%) aged 18 to 24, 134 people (14.5%) aged 25 to 44, 368 people (39.8%) aged 45 to 64, and 214 people (23.2%) who were 65 or older. The median age was 52.2 years. For every 100 females, there were 102.2 males. For every 100 females age 18 and over, there were 99.2 males.

There were 375 housing units at an average density of ,of which 360 were occupied, 328 (91.1%) by the owners and 32 (8.9%) by renters.  The homeowner vacancy rate was 1.2%; the rental vacancy rate was 0%. 847 people (91.7% of the population) lived in owner-occupied housing units and 77 people (8.3%) lived in rental housing units.

References

Census-designated places in Contra Costa County, California
Census-designated places in California